The 1997 Kremlin Cup was a tennis tournament played on indoor carpet courts at the Olympic Stadium in Moscow in Russia that was part of the World Series of the 1997 ATP Tour and of Tier I of the 1997 WTA Tour. The men's tournament was held from 3 November through 9 November 1997 while the women's tournament was held from 27 October through 2 November 1997. Yevgeny Kafelnikov and Jana Novotná won the singles titles.

Finals

Men's singles

 Yevgeny Kafelnikov defeated  Petr Korda 7–6(7–2), 6–4
 It was Kafelnikov's 3rd title of the year and the 14th of his career.

Women's singles

 Jana Novotná defeated  Ai Sugiyama 6–3, 6–4
 It was Novotná's 3rd title of the year and the 18th of her career.

Men's doubles

 Martin Damm /  Cyril Suk defeated  David Adams /  Fabrice Santoro 6–4, 6–3
 It was Damm's 3rd title of the year and the 11th of his career. It was Suk's only title of the year and the 17th of his career.

Women's doubles

 Arantxa Sánchez Vicario /  Natasha Zvereva defeated  Yayuk Basuki /  Caroline Vis 5–3 (Basuki and Vis defaulted)
 It was Sánchez Vicario's 7th title of the year and the 56th of her career. It was Zvereva's 8th title of the year and the 67th of her career.

External links
 ATP Tournament Profile
 WTA Tournament Profile

Kremlin Cup
Kremlin Cup
Kremlin Cup
Kremlin Cup
Kremlin Cup
Kremlin Cup
Kremlin Cup